Anisochoria is a genus of skippers in the family Hesperiidae.

Species
Recognised species in the genus Anisochoria include:
 Anisochoria bacchus Evans, 1953
 Anisochoria extincta Hayward, 1933
 Anisochoria minorella Mabille, 1897
 Anisochoria pedaliodina Evans, 1953
 Anisochoria polysticta Mabille, 1870
 Anisochoria quadrifenestrata (Bryk, 1953)
 Anisochoria sublimbata Mabille, 1883
 Anisochoria verda Evans, 1953

References

Natural History Museum Lepidoptera genus database

Pyrgini
Hesperiidae genera
Taxa named by Paul Mabille